Kayo Chingonyi FRSL (born 1987) is a Zambian-British poet and editor who is the author of two poetry collections, Kumukanda and A Blood Condition. He has also published two pamphlets, Some Bright Elegance (Salt, 2012) and The Colour of James Brown’s Scream (Akashic, 2016). He is a writer and presenter for the music and culture podcast Decode. Chingonyi has won the Geoffrey Dearmer Prize, Dylan Thomas Prize and Somerset Maugham Award. He was elected as a Fellow of the Royal Society of Literature in 2022.

Biography 
Chingonyi was born in Zambia in 1987 and moved to the UK at the age of six. He has a BA in English literature from the University of Sheffield and an MA in creative writing from Royal Holloway, University of London.

Writing 
Chingonyi's collection, Kumukanda (Vintage Publishing, 2017) won the Dylan Thomas Prize and a Somerset Maugham Award. Kumukanda was also shortlisted for the Costa Poetry Prize and the Seamus Heaney Centre First Poetry Collection Prize, the Ted Hughes Award for New Work in Poetry, the Roehampton Poetry Prize and the Jhalak Prize. His second collection, A Blood Condition was published in 2021 by Vintage Publishing.

Chingonyi's work has been published in several anthologies such as The Best British Poetry, The Emma Press Anthology of Aunts, The Emma Press Anthology of Political Poems, Out of Bounds: British Black & Asian Poetry, and Ten: The New Wave. His essays, poems and reviews have been featured in online and print publications. He won a Geoffrey Dearmer Prize in 2012. In 2015, he was Associate Poet at the Institute of Contemporary Arts. Chingonyi was a Burgess Fellow at the Centre for New Writing, University of Manchester. He then went on to be assistant professor of creative writing at Durham University.

He is the founding editor of The Poetics of Grime, poetry editor for The White Review and has edited issues of Magma Poetry and Poetry Review.

Chingonyi was mentored on The Complete Works poets of colour mentoring scheme initiated by Bernardine Evaristo to redress representational invisibility. The scheme (2007–2017) was directed by Dr Natalie Teitler, during which time thirty poets were mentored.

Awards and honours 
 2012: Geoffrey Dearmer Prize
 2018: Dylan Thomas Prize
 2018: Somerset Maugham Award.
 2018: Shortlisted for the Seamus Heaney Centre First Poetry Collection Prize
 2018: Shortlisted for Ted Hughes Award for New Work in Poetry
 2018: Shortlisted for Roehampton Poetry Prize
 2018: Shortlisted for the Jhalak Prize
 2019: Shortlisted for the Costa Poetry Prize
 2022: Elected a Fellow of the Royal Society of Literature

References

External links
 Official website

1987 births
Academics of Durham University
Alumni of Royal Holloway, University of London
Alumni of the  University of Sheffield
British literary editors
British male poets
British people of Zambian descent
British podcasters
British poets
Living people
Zambian poets
Black British writers